Line 5 of CRT is a rapid transit line in Chongqing, China, which opened on 28 December 2017.

History

Phase 1
Phase 1 of the line (from The EXPO Garden Center station to Tiaodeng station) began construction on 3 December 2013.

The north section from The EXPO Garden Center to Dalongshan started operation on 28 December 2017, and it extended to Dashiba on 24 December 2018. The south section from Shiqiaopu to Tiaodeng started operation on 20 January 2021. However, the central section from Dashiba to Shiqiaopu is still under construction.

Northern extension
The northern extension of this line began construction on 25 January 2019. The extension opened on 27 February 2023.

Opening timeline

Route map

Stations

Line 5

Jiangtiao line 

Jiangtiao line (Chinese: 江跳线) had been formerly known as the extension of Line 5. The section from Tiaodeng to Shengquansi ( in length) opened in August 2022. The section from Shengquansi to Dingshan ( in length) is currently under construction.

References

 
Railway lines opened in 2017
2017 establishments in China
1500 V DC railway electrification